The 1985 Dora Mavor Moore Awards celebrated excellence in theatre from the Toronto Alliance for the Performing Arts.

Winners and nominees

General Theatre Division

Musical Theatre or Revue Division

Independent Theatre Division

Theatre for Young Audiences Division

See also
39th Tony Awards
1985 Laurence Olivier Awards

References

1985 in Toronto
Dora Awards, 1985
Dora Mavor Moore Awards ceremonies